Monardella cinerea is a rare species of flowering plant in the mint family known by the common name gray monardella. It is endemic to California, where it is known from the San Gabriel Mountains and San Jacinto Mountains in the Los Angeles area, and the central coast Santa Lucia Mountains in the Los Padres National Forest. It grows in rocky forested areas.

Description
Monardella cinerea is a small, hairy perennial herb growing in a low mat, its stems no more than 15 centimeters long. The triangular leaves are very hairy, gland-dotted, and under a centimeter in length. The inflorescence is a head of several flowers blooming in a cup of reddish or purplish rough-hairy bracts. The flowers are purplish pink in color.

External links
 Calflora Database: Monardella australis ssp. cinerea (Gray monardella) — current botanical name.
Jepson Manual eFlora (TJM2) treatment of Monardella australis ssp. cinerea — current botanical name.
USDA Plants Profile for Monardella cinerea (gray monardella)
UC Photos gallery: Monardella australis ssp. cinerea

cinerea
Endemic flora of California
Natural history of the California Coast Ranges
Natural history of the Peninsular Ranges
Natural history of the Transverse Ranges
~
Flora and fauna of the San Jacinto Mountains
~
Monterey Ranger District, Los Padres National Forest
Flora without expected TNC conservation status